Dulaara may refer to:
 Dulaara (1994 film), an Indian Hindi-language mystery thriller comedy film
 Dulaara (2015 film), an Indian Bhojpuri-language film